Tryggvi Hrafn Haraldsson (born 30 September 1996) is an Icelandic footballer who plays as a forward for Valur.

International career
Tryggvi made his senior team debut against Mexico on 8 February 2017.

International goals

References

External links

1996 births
Living people
Tryggvi Hrafn Haraldsson
Tryggvi Hrafn Haraldsson
Tryggvi Hrafn Haraldsson
Association football forwards
Tryggvi Hrafn Haraldsson
Halmstads BK players
Allsvenskan players
Superettan players
Lillestrøm SK players
Norwegian First Division players
Tryggvi Hrafn Haraldsson
Expatriate footballers in Sweden
Tryggvi Hrafn Haraldsson
Expatriate footballers in Norway
Tryggvi Hrafn Haraldsson
Valur (men's football) players